Collection of daily memoriess of Hashemi Rafsanjani is a collection of diaries written by late Iranian politician Akbar Hashemi Rafsanjani.

Part of his diary is not published due to security reasons.

Volumes
Hashemi’s memoirs begin in March 1981, therefore omitting the first two years after the Islamic Revolution of 1979. So far, 8 books of Hashemi’s memories, covering from March 1981 until 1989 have been published:

 Weathering the Crisis (March 1981-March 1982)
 After the Crisis (March 1982-March 1983)
 Stability and Challenge (March 1983-March 1984)
 Towards Destiny (March 1984-March 1985)
 Defense (1986)
 Defense and Politics  (1987) 
 End of  Defense, beginning of reconstruction (1988)
 Reconstruction (1989)

References

See also 
 The official History of the Islamic republic of Iran

History books about Iran
Books by Akbar Hashemi Rafsanjani